OzLand is a 2014 American science fantasy drama independent film starring Zack Ratkovich and Glenn Payne. It was written and directed by Michael Williams in his feature directorial debut.

The film's story and characters are inspired by and are references to characters and events that appear in L. Frank Baum's 1900 novel The Wonderful Wizard of Oz.

Plot
Two men, Lief (Ratkovich) and Emri (Payne), wander through the fields and abandoned homes of a post-apocalyptic Kansas, searching for food. Lief, the younger of the two and the only one who can read, finds a copy of The Wonderful Wizard of Oz and begins to treat the novel as if it were historical nonfiction, using their surroundings as proof. Leif comes to question whether OzLand is "home" as described by Dorothy Gale, while Emri suggests every day is a journey through "home".

Cast
 Zack Ratkovich as Lief
 Glenn Payne as Emri
 Dunlap Peeples IV as Loi/FM
 Casey Heflin as Dee (voice)

Production
The film was shot entirely on location in Minneola, Kansas and Northern Mississippi.

Release
OzLand held its premiere in Columbus, Mississippi on September 4, 2014, followed by screenings at the Magnolia Independent Film Festival, Oxford Film Festival, Tupelo Film Festival and FestivalSouth Film Expo throughout the following year. It made its theatrical debut in Hollywood on October 16, 2015, followed by its release on internet streaming platforms four days later. It was released to DVD on July 26, 2016. The film made its United Kingdom debut on Flix Premiere on October 4, 2016.

In 2018, the film's distribution rights were reverted to the filmmaker and his company, Shendopen Productions, LLC. At this point, the film was re-released on Amazon Prime in the US and UK, Vimeo on Demand Worldwide, and a limited edition Blu-ray release with hours of bonus features and never-before-released content.

Critical reception
The film received mixed-to-positive reviews, with critics praising the cinematography, music and directing, while a few criticized the writing. Ryan Jay of Premiere Radio Networks wrote a positive review, saying "It’s brilliant!  The story is complete and fulfilling; such an impressive accomplishment. The cinematography is extraordinary and meticulous. It’s shot like it was backed by a major studio with a blockbuster budget."

Jacob Medel of Life in LA wrote that "OzLand is rich with detail and powerful character-driven storytelling. Written, produced and directed by Michael Williams, the film is a singular vision that follows Leif and Emri as they travel across a barren wasteland in search of a place to call home."

Katie Walsh of the Los Angeles Times wrote a mixed review, criticizing the writing but praising the cinematography and music, by writing "The bright, saturated cinematography and minimalist guitar-based score by Keatzi Gunmoney are the greatest strengths of OzLand, but they can't overcome the meandering story and stilted dialogue. The movie — directed, written, produced, shot and edited by Michael Williams — takes what could be an interesting concept for a short film and stretches it across 105 minutes. The ideas are not deep enough and the dramatic tension isn't real enough to sustain this feature."

Awards
 Best Feature at Magnolia Independent Film Festival (2015)
 Best Cinematography, Magnolia Independent Film Festival (2015)
 Best of Show, Tupelo Film Festival (2015)
 1st Place Feature, Tupelo Film Festival (2015)
 Elvin Whitesides Director's Award, Tupelo Film Festival (2015)
 Best Feature Film, Real to Reel Film Festival (2015)
 Best Narrative Feature, Offshoot Film Festival (2015)
 Best Cinematography, FestivalSouth Film Expo (2015)

References

External links
 
 

2014 films
2014 fantasy films
2014 independent films
2010s science fiction films
American independent films
American science fantasy films
Films about novels
Films based on The Wizard of Oz
Films directed by Michael Williams (film director)
Films set in Kansas
Films shot in Kansas
Films shot in Mississippi
Oz (franchise)
American post-apocalyptic films
2014 directorial debut films
2014 drama films
2010s English-language films
2010s American films